Piaseczno  is a town in east-central Poland with 47,660 inhabitants. 
It is a popular residential area and a suburb of Warsaw that is strongly linked to the capital, both economically and culturally. It is the capital city of Piaseczno County.

History

Early history
The origins of the city date back to a 13th-century village, located on the route between Warsaw and Czersk. Its strategic position meant that the village grew quickly. On 5 November 1429 the town obtained a charter, and soon became a local market. A further charter was confirmed in 1461.

In 1537 the town became Royal property and in the second half of the 16th century reached 1200 inhabitants based round the brewing and transport industries. Piaseczno was a royal town of Poland, administratively located in the Masovian Voivodeship in the Greater Poland Province. However, the city suffered setbacks because of numerous fires in the late 16th and early 17th centuries but returned to its former glory in the first half of the 18th century.

The town church was built in 1736 by architect Carl Frederick Pöppelmann and during the second partition of Poland the city was burned during the Battle of Gołków which took place on 9 and 10 July 1794. Only a church and few houses survived.

Late modern era
From 1806 to 1807 a French cavalry unit was stationed in the town as part of the Napoleonic wars, and from 1808 to 1811 this was replaced by the Polish 1st Regiment mounted rifles. The Congress of Vienna, saw the area ceded to Russia in 1815.

In 1825 the road from Warsaw and shortly afterward the railway improved links to Warsaw. As a result, Piaseczno experienced a period of economic recovery. Local Poles took part in the large January Uprising of 1863–1864. On June 15, 1864, a clash between Polish insurgents and Russian troops took place near Piaseczno.

In September and October 1914 Piaseczno was the site of fierce fighting between German and Russian forces in the battle for Warsaw. In May 1917, the new City Council held its first council meeting. In November 1918, German gendarmerie surrendered to local Poles and the town was restored to Poland, which just regained independence. In the interbellum Piaseczno formed part of the Polish Warsaw Voivodeship.

On June 4, 1928, Polish President Ignacy Mościcki laid the cornerstone for the folk house and in 1933 Marshal Józef Piłsudski was made an honorary citizen of the city.

World War II

World War II began for the city on 9 and 10 September 1939, when the Polish 54 light artillery regiment fought a skirmish with a German armored division. On September 10, 1939, German troops committed a massacre of 21 Polish prisoners of war in the town (see also Nazi crimes against the Polish nation). Afterwards, the Germans terrorized the population, and Poles over the age of 14 were subjected to forced labour. Additionally, around 400 people were captured in roundups and deported to forced labour in Germany. The Germans also committed massacres of Poles in nearby forests as part of the AB-Aktion.

In 1940, during the Nazi Occupation of Poland, German authorities established a Jewish ghetto in Piaseczno, in order to confine its Jewish population for the purpose of persecution and exploitation. From there, most victims were sent to Treblinka extermination camp.

In 1944, local Poles supported the Polish Warsaw Uprising, which took place in nearby Warsaw, and some were killed by the Germans in revenge. From August 1944, a secret Polish hospital for wounded insurgents from Warsaw operated in the town. The German occupation ended on January 17, 1945, when the Polish 1st Warsaw Armoured Brigade entered the town without a fight.

Town Hall
The original Town Hall was burned down in 1655 by the Swedes during the deluge. The second accidentally burned down in 1730. A third Town Hall was constructed in the middle of the 18th century but was burned down during the Kościuszko Uprising in 1794. In 1815 the Russians began rebuilding it and the current Town hall was built in a classical style between 1823 and 1824.

Religious communities

For some time the town of Piaseczno had a diverse religious community.

 In 1820 there were 893 inhabitants, of whom 171 were Jews (about 19%).
 The 1897 census showed Piaseczno had 2760 inhabitants with 41.5% Catholics, 40% Jewish and 17.9% protestant.
 In 1918 there were 6956 people in the town. Catholics were about 40%,  Jews about 56% and sizable protestant and Orthodox populations also existed.

As stated above, the Jewish community was deported to the Warsaw Ghetto in 1940.

Piaseczno was the seat of a Hasidic dynasty founded by Rabbi Kalonymus Kalman Shapiro, currently maintained by his extended family in Israel.

Historic and modern landmarks

 Gothic-Renaissance Church of St. Anne
 Piaseczno Town Hall
 Regional Museum (Muzeum Regionalne)
 The parish cemetery (1795)
 Villa Besserówka, where the Poles disarmed the German gendarmerie and thus liberated the town from German occupation in 1918
 Memorial to Warsaw Uprising participants executed by the Germans in Piaseczno in 1944
 Former secret Polish hospital for Warsaw Uprising participants with a memorial plaque
 House-Museum of Georgian Officers of the Polish Army (Dom Muzeum Gruzińskich Oficerów Wojska Polskiego)
 Jewish bath
 The Jewish cemetery
 Former Piaseczno Ghetto

International relations

Twin towns — Sister cities
Piaseczno is twinned with:
 Upplands Vasby, Sweden
 Harku Parish, Estonia
 Zviahel, Ukraine
 Guadix, Spain

References

External links 

 County Piaseczno website
 Piaseczno - Local information Police, Hotel, Restaurant
 Local News Service
 Jewish Community in Piaseczno on Virtual Shtetl
 

Cities and towns in Masovian Voivodeship
Piaseczno County
Masovian Voivodeship (1526–1795)
Warsaw Governorate
Warsaw Voivodeship (1919–1939)
Holocaust locations in Poland
Nazi war crimes in Poland
World War II prisoner of war massacres by Nazi Germany